Tsui Wah may refer to:
 Tsui Wah Restaurant
 Tsui Wah Ferry